The 1934 United States Senate election in Massachusetts was held on November 6, 1934. Democratic incumbent David I. Walsh was re-elected to a second consecutive term in a landslide over Republican Robert M. Washburn.

Democratic primary

Candidates
 Edward P. Barry, former Lieutenant Governor of Massachusetts (1914–15)
 William Donahoe, former State Representative from Boston
 David I. Walsh, incumbent Senator

Results

Republican primary

Candidates
 Robert M. Washburn, writer and candidate for Senate in 1928

Results

General election

Candidates
 Albert Sprague Coolidge, candidate for Massachusetts Secretary of the Commonwealth in 1930 and 1932 (Socialist)
 Barnard Smith (Prohibition)
 David I. Walsh, incumbent Senator since 1926 (Democratic)
 Robert M. Washburn, writer and candidate for Senate in 1928 (Republican)
 Albert L. Waterman, candidate for Secertary of the Commonwealth in 1932 and Treasurer in 1920 (Socialist Labor)
 Paul C. Wicks, candidate for U.S. House in 1932 (Communist)

Results

References

1934
Massachusetts
1934 Massachusetts elections